Vastse-Kuuste Parish was a rural municipality of Estonia, in Põlva County. It had a population of 1,255 (as of 1 January 2009) and an area of 123.01 km².

Settlements
Small borough
Vastse-Kuuste
Villages
Karilatsi - Kiidjärve - Koorvere - Leevijõe - Logina - Lootvina - Padari - Popsiküla - Valgemetsa - Vooreküla

References

External links
Official website